Leap day, February 29, is a date added to leap years.

Leap Day may also refer to:

 Leap Day (TV series), a 2020 Hong Kong drama series
 Leap Day (30 Rock), an episode of 30 Rock
 Leap Day (Modern Family), an episode of Modern Family
 Leap Day (video game), a 2016 platform video game